Omar Amadou Jallow is a Gambian politician who was the Minister of Agriculture in President Adama Barrow's cabinet. Jallow is also the leader of the People's Progressive Party, which has two seats in the National Assembly.

Political career 
Jallow was a People's Progressive Party government minister under Dawda Jawara, being the incumbent Minister of Agriculture when Yahya Jammeh executed the coup d'état that saw him seize power in 1994. Throughout Jammeh's time in power, Jallow was arrested on 22 separate occasions. He was tortured on four occasions. On the day of Adama Barrow's inauguration in February 2017, Jallow told Reuters "Today, I have been vindicated."

Jallow was re-appointed as Minister of Agriculture by Barrow after he won the 2016 presidential election. However, Mr Jallow was fired in June 2018. His sacking came barely two weeks after his ministry reportedly contracted a private individual to sell/dispose of toxic fertilizer under their custody without following due procedure and for "financial reason".

Multi Award-winning Gambian journalist Mustapha K Darboe did the story which was further verified by the State House. The state agents investigated the issue and the presidency covered it up until the revelation by Kerr Fatou news media. On October 10, Gambian justice minister Abubacarr Tambadou told journalists that the Government has requested further investigation into the incident.

However, the tough-talking Gambian politician claimed he was defamed and sued the news media and the journalist for the story, seeking D20 million in damages. In his first press conference since the story broke, OJ did not though refute the core of the story which is that the fertiliser in a government custody was contracted to one Modou Dibba  to sell it. But he maintained that he was not aware of it nor did he benefit from it financially.

But both the journalist who did the story and Kerr Fatou stood by their story.

OJ has made name for himself as a tough-talking Gambian politician with a liberal mind. He is Gambia's first politician to have called for legalization of Marijuana and also repealing of country's tough anti-gay law. Mr Jallow, a key member of the coalition that brought down Jammeh, also holds a different opinion with the Gambian leader Barrow on whether he should stay in power for five years. Jallow has always said Barrow should quit after three years even  though Barrow has shown ambitions to stay for even ten years.

References 

Living people
Government ministers of the Gambia
People's Progressive Party (Gambia) politicians
Gambian democracy activists
Leaders of political parties in the Gambia
Year of birth missing (living people)